Small Dam is located in Naryab, Tehsil Thal . Hangu District of Khyber-Pakhtunkhwa . It is one of a number of small water reservoir constructed in Khyber-Pakhtunkhwa to provide water for irrigation and drinking in times of drought. There are no other dam within 55 km2. This dam was designed by Mussadiq Khan Bangash(electrical electronics engineer)....

References

Buildings and structures in Hangu District, Pakistan
Dams in Pakistan